

Station List

Ya

Yo

Yu

Y